Bear Lake State Parks may refer to:

Bear Lake State Park (Idaho), on Bear Lake, Idaho, U.S., near the Utah-Idaho border
Bear Lake State Park (Utah), on Bear Lake, Utah, U.S., near the Utah-Idaho border

See also
Bear Creek Lake State Park, Virginia, U.S.
Bear Head Lake State Park, Minnesota, U.S.